The 1924 Bulgarian State Football Championship was the first edition of the Bulgarian State Football Championship.
It was contested by 6 teams. The championship was not finished and there wasn't any winner.

At the semi-finals, in match between Vladislav Varna and Levski Sofia was not judged to be played extra time due to insufficient light to continue the game. Vladislav refuse to replay the game on the next day in Sofia, and leave for Varna, demanding the replay to be staged there. The Bulgarian
National Sports Federation (BNSF) at first sets a new date for the replay, which is again to take place in Sofia, then give in and allow for the game to be played in Varna, but only if Vladislav and the North-Bulgarian sport federation cover the losses for the Sofia replay that didn't take place. At the end BNSF and Vladislav did not reach final agreement and the championship was abandoned.

Teams
The teams that participated in the competition were the six winners of their local sport federations.

Quarter-finals

|}

Semi-finals

|}

References
Bulgaria - List of final tables (RSSSF)

Bulgarian State Football Championship seasons
Bul
1